Neudd-fawr (also spelt Neuadd Fawr) is a small village in the  community of Llanwnnen, Ceredigion, Wales, which is 59.9 miles (96.4 km) from Cardiff and 176.3 miles (283.7 km) from London. Neudd-fawr is represented in the Senedd by Elin Jones (Plaid Cymru) and is part of the Ceredigion constituency in the House of Commons.

Etymology
The meaning of this Welsh language name is "Great Hall".

References

See also
List of localities in Wales by population

Villages in Ceredigion